Cristina Guzmán, Foreign Language Teacher (Spanish:Cristina Guzmán, profesora de idiomas) is a 1936 novel by the Spanish writer Carmen de Icaza. A young single mother who has fallen on hard times, uses her skill with languages to become a teacher in a wealthy household. The work combined both feminist and conservative themes.

Adaptations
In 1943 it was turned into a Spanish film Cristina Guzmán directed by Gonzalo Delgrás. The film was remade in 1968, directed by Luis César Amadori. There were also stage versions, as well as a 1966 Mexican television version.

References

Bibliography
  Maureen Ihrie & Salvador Oropesa. World Literature in Spanish: An Encyclopedia: An Encyclopedia. ABC-CLIO, 20 Oct 2011.

Novels by Carmen de Icaza
1936 novels
20th-century Spanish novels
Novels set in Spain
Spanish novels adapted into films